The Graduate Pharmacy Aptitude Test is an annual allIndia examination conducted by National Testing Agency on computer based test mode only, to evaluate candidates for admission of Pharmacy graduates into the Masters (M. Pharm) programmes. Until 2018, it was conducted by All India Council for Technical Education, New Delhi. The results are also used to determine eligibility of students for scholarships and other financial assistance.

The syllabus and the pattern of question paper remains the same under NTA. There is no increase in the exam fees currently being charged.
This includes about a 70 pages of syllabus which comprises all of the subjects included in all years of Bpharm course.

See also

 List of Public service commissions in India

References

External links 

GPAT 2020
Pharmacy education in India

:[GPAT 2021 Qualifying Topics]